The Bezirksliga Main-Hessen was the highest association football league in the German state of Hesse and the Prussian province of Hesse-Nassau from 1923 to 1927, when the league was replaced by the Bezirksliga Main-Hessen.

Overview 
The league was formed in 1923, after a league reform which was decided upon in Darmstadt, Hesse. It replaced the Kreisliga Nordmain and the Kreisliga Südmain as the highest leagues in the region. Apart from clubs from Hesse, with the Viktoria Aschaffenburg, the league also included one club from Bavaria.

The Bezirksliga Main, named after the river Main,  started out with eight teams, playing each other in a home-and-away round with the league winner advancing to the Southern German championship, which in turn was a qualification tournament for the German championship.

The league modus remained unchanged for its first three seasons, 1923–24, 1924–25 and 1925–26. For its last edition however, it expanded to ten clubs. Additionally, the leagues runners-up also qualified for a "consolidation" round with the other runners-up of the southern Bezirksligas. The winner of this round was awarded the third entry spot for the south to the German finals.

In an attempt to bring all Southern German leagues to a similar system, the Bezirksligas were reorganised in 1927. For the Bezirksliga Main, this meant, it joined with the northern clubs of the Bezirksliga Rheinhessen-Saar to form the new Bezirksliga Main-Hessen. In practice, this meant little change for the league as the new Bezirksliga was immediately sub-divided into two independent, regional divisions. Out of the ten clubs in the league, nine went to the new Bezirksliga Main-Hessen - Main division, only the VfL Neu-Isenburg found itself grouped into the Hessen division of the new league.

National success

Southern German championship
Qualified teams and their success:
 1924:
 FSV Frankfurt, 5th place
 1925:
 FSV Frankfurt, 3rd place
 1926:
 FSV Frankfurt, 3rd place
 1927:
 Eintracht Frankfurt, 3rd place Bezirksliga-runners-up round
 FSV Frankfurt, 3rd place

German championship
Qualified teams and their success:
 1924:
 none qualified
 1925:
 FSV Frankfurt, Final
 1926:
 FSV Frankfurt, Quarter final
 1927:
 none qualified

Founding members of the league
The league was formed from eight teams:
 FSV Frankfurt
 Eintracht Frankfurt
 FC Hanau 93
 Helvetia Frankfurt
 Kickers Offenbach
 SC Bürgel
 Viktoria Aschaffenburg
 SpVgg Offenbach

Winners and runners-up of the Bezirksliga Main

Placings in the Bezirksliga Main 1923 to 1927

Source:
 The Helvetia Frankfurt and VfR Frankfurt merged in 1926 to form Rot-Weiß Frankfurt.

References

Sources
 Fussball-Jahrbuch Deutschland  (8 vol.), Tables and results of the German tier-one leagues 1919–33, publisher: DSFS
 Kicker Almanach,  The yearbook on German football from Bundesliga to Oberliga, since 1937, published by the Kicker Sports Magazine
 Süddeutschlands Fussballgeschichte in Tabellenform 1897-1988  History of Southern German football in tables, publisher & author: Ludolf Hyll

External links
 The Gauligas  Das Deutsche Fussball Archiv
 German league tables 1892-1933  Hirschi's Fussball seiten
 Germany - Championships 1902-1945 at RSSSF.com

1
1923 establishments in Germany
1927 disestablishments in Germany
Football competitions in Hesse
Southern German football championship